The European Union (Withdrawal Agreement) Act 2020 is an Act of the Gibraltar Parliament that incorporates the Brexit Withdrawal Agreement into the law of Gibraltar as part of the UK's exit from the European Union (Brexit) on 31 January 2020. The Act received Royal Assent two days before the European Union (Withdrawal Agreement) Act 2020 received its Royal Assent after being passed by the UK Parliament.

See also
European Union (Withdrawal Agreement) Act 2020
United Kingdom invocation of Article 50 of the Treaty on European Union
Gibraltar after Brexit

External links
 Full text

References

Gibraltar and the European Union
2020 in the European Union
Consequences of the 2016 United Kingdom European Union membership referendum
Brexit
2020 in Gibraltar
2020 in law